Ferdinand Ickes (born 12 July 1911, date of death unknown) was a German racing cyclist. He rode in the 1935 Tour de France.

References

External links
 

1911 births
Year of death missing
German male cyclists
Place of birth missing
Sportspeople from Wiesbaden
Cyclists from Hesse